Károly Garam (born 10 May 1941, Eger) is a Hungarian-Finnish cello player and the brother of violinist :fi:Lajos Garam.

Károly Garam studied cello playing in the Sibelius Academy in Finland under Vili Pullinen and Yrjö Selin. He held his first concert in 1966.

Recordings

 Minä rakastan sinua (1979)
 Aattoiltana (1988)
 Lauluja sinulle (1990)

References

1941 births
Living people
Finnish male musicians
Hungarian male musicians
Hungarian classical cellists
Hungarian cellists
Hungarian emigrants to Finland
People from Eger
Finnish people of Hungarian descent